Giuliana Bridge is a box girder / haunched girder bridge constructed from prestressed concrete in Benghazi, Libya. It has a three-span main structure which was originally built in the 1970s but was rehabilitated in 2005 by Bilfinger Berger.

See also
 List of bridges in Libya

References

Bridges in Libya
Buildings and structures in Benghazi
First Libyan Civil War